Sillok (Aka) is a Nilo-Saharan language spoken by the Sillok people of Sudan. It is spoken by around 300 people in Blue Nile state, specifically on Mount Silak (Jebel Silak), southwest of the Ingessana hills.

According to Ethnologue the language is moribund, having been heavily Arabicised and influenced by the nearby Berta language. The Sillok people who speak the language are a remnant group.

References

External links
 Aka basic lexicon at the Global Lexicostatistical Database

Eastern Jebel languages
Languages of Sudan